Hyung-don and Dae-joon's Hitmaker is a 2014 South Korean variety television series presented by South Korean producer duo Jeong Hyeong-don and Defconn. It first aired on MBC Every1 on Tuesday at 6:00 pm KST beginning July 29, 2014. It ran for two seasons in 2014 and 2015, documenting the formation and debut processes of their first boy group Big Byung and their first girl group Chamsonyeo. It was renewed for another season in 2016, with Season 1 and 2 host Defconn being replaced by Beast's Yong Jun-hyung. The hosts, along with N.Flying's Cha Hun, travelled to Dublin, Ireland, to stage a performance.

Season 1
In the first season, producer duo Jeong Hyeong-don and Defconn find members to participate in their first boy group, later named Big Byung, using music they wrote and composed. They recruit VIXX's Hyuk and N, Got7's Jackson and BToB's Sungjae. The group then releases two singles: "Stress Come On" and "Ojingeo Doenjang".

Season 2
In the second season, Jeong Hyeong-don and Defconn find members to participate in their first girl group, later named Chamsonyeo, using music they wrote and composed. They recruit Kara's Youngji, After School's Lizzy, G.NA and 4minute's So-hyun. The group released the single "Magic Words" on February 20.

Season 3
In the third season, BEAST's Yong Jun-hyung takes over for Defconn as host. The season was filmed in Dublin, Ireland, with Hyeong-don, Jun-hyung and N.Flying's Cha Hun.

Cast

Hosts
 Jeong Hyeong-don (Season 1—3)
 Defconn (Season 1 & 2)
 Yong Jun-hyung (Season 3)

Big Byung

Chamsonyeo

LUDONPH YONGJUNKO

Discography

Singles

Music videos

Awards and nominations

References

External links
 Official website (Season 1)
 Official website (Season 2)

2014 South Korean television series debuts
2015 South Korean television series endings
Korean-language television shows
MBC TV original programming
South Korean variety television shows